Berwick is a town in York County, Maine, United States, situated in the southern part of the state beside the Salmon Falls River.

Today's South Berwick was set off from Berwick in 1814, North Berwick in 1831.

The population was 7,950 at the 2020 census. It is part of the Portland–South Portland–Biddeford, Maine metropolitan statistical area.

History

Originally part of Kittery, the area later comprised by Berwick was settled about 1631 and called Kittery Commons or Kittery North Parish. It was later called Unity after the ship that transported Scots prisoners of war from the Battle of Dunbar in 1650 to the colonies. These Scots had been force-marched to Durham Cathedral in Durham, England, then tried for treason for supporting Charles II rather than Oliver Cromwell, Lord Protector. Many settled near Berwick in an area near the northern Eliot-York border, which came to be known—and still is—as Scotland Bridge.
 
Landing in Massachusetts, the royalist soldiers were sold as indentured servants, many of whom went to work at the Great Works sawmill, located on the Great Works River, until they were able to pay for their own freedom. (George Gray, formerly of Lanark, Scotland, was an example of the 150 prisoners who endured this ordeal. In 1675, he defended his family and lands when the community was attacked during King Philip's War, and died in Unity in 1693. His descendants would populate other areas of Maine, notably Deer Isle and Stonington, Maine).

The raid by Indians in 1675 was the first of several during what was known as King Philip's War. In 1690–1691 during King William's War, the village was burned and abandoned in the Raid on Salmon Falls. It was resettled in 1703 and called Newichawannock, its old Abenaki name. In 1713, it was incorporated by the Massachusetts General Court as Berwick, after Berwick-upon-Tweed, England. The first schoolhouse in the state was built here in 1719. The town was raided numerous times during Father Rale's War. Berwick was once considerably larger in size, but South Berwick was set off in 1814, followed by North Berwick in 1831. Lumbering was a principal early industry. The first lumber exported from the American colonies was clapboards and barrel staves loaded aboard Pied Cowe at South Berwick in 1634. Beginning in the 19th century, Berwick had a symbiotic economic relationship with Somersworth, New Hampshire, the mill town to which it is connected by bridge.

Geography
Berwick is drained by the Little River and Salmon Falls River. Diamond Hill, elevation 490 feet (149.4 m) above sea level, is the town's highest point. The lowest elevation, which is approximately 70 feet (21.3 m) above sea level, is on the Salmon River as it crosses the southernmost town border with South Berwick.

The town is served by state routes 9 and 236.

Climate
This climatic region is typified by large seasonal temperature differences, with warm to hot (and often humid) summers and cold (sometimes severely cold) winters.  According to the Köppen Climate Classification system, Berwick has a humid continental climate, abbreviated "Dfb" on climate maps.

Demographics

2010 census
As of the census of 2010, there were 7,246 people, 2,749 households, and 2,029 families residing in the town. The racial makeup of the town was 96.2% White, 0.5% African American, 0.2% Native American, 1.3% Asian, 0.2% from other races, and 1.6% from two or more races. Hispanic or Latino of any race were 1.3% of the population.

There were 2,749 households, of which 36.9% had children under the age of 18 living with them, 58.1% were married couples living together, 10.7% had a female householder with no husband present, 5.0% had a male householder with no wife present, and 26.2% were non-families. 20.6% of all households were made up of individuals, and 6.6% had someone living alone who was 65 years of age or older. The average household size was 2.62 and the average family size was 3.01.

The median age in the town was 39.1 years. 25.2% of residents were under the age of 18; 6.7% were between the ages of 18 and 24; 26.9% were from 25 to 44; 30.1% were from 45 to 64; and 11% were 65 years of age or older. The gender makeup of the town was 49.4% male and 50.6% female.

2000 census
As of the census of 2000, there were 6,353 people, 2,319 households, and 1,723 families residing in the town. The racial makeup of the town was 97.31% White, 0.36% Black or African American, 0.14% Native American, 1.16% Asian, 0.03% Pacific Islander, 0.06% from other races, and 0.93% from two or more races. Hispanic or Latino of any race were 0.54% of the population.

There were 2,319 households, out of which 40.3% had children under the age of 18 living with them, 59.0% were married couples living together, 11.0% had a female householder with no husband present, and 25.7% were non-families. 20.4% of all households were made up of individuals, and 7.2% had someone living alone who was 65 years of age or older.  The average household size was 2.72 and the average family size was 3.15.

In the town, the population was spread out, with 29.1% under the age of 18, 7.6% from 18 to 24, 32.5% from 25 to 44, 21.2% from 45 to 64, and 9.5% who were 65 years of age or older.  The median age was 36 years. For every 100 females, there were 95.8 males.  For every 100 females age 18 and over, there were 94.6 males.

The median income for a household in the town was $44,629, and the median income for a family was $53,776. Males had a median income of $36,329 versus $24,911 for females. The per capita income for the town was $18,988.  About 6.9% of families and 8.3% of the population were below the poverty line, including 9.0% of those under age 18 and 15.9% of those age 65 or over.

Notable people 

 Daniel B. Allyn, Vice Chief of Staff of the United States Army, 2014–2017
 John Jay Butler, minister and professor
 Benjamin Franklin Hayes, legislator and judge
 Frederick Hayes, Civil War veteran, awarded medal of honor 
 John Alfred Hayes, Union Army physician
 Jonathan Lethem, writer
 Alphonso M. Lunt, army sergeant
 James Sullivan, seventh governor of Massachusetts

Schools in Berwick
Berwick Maine is part of MSAD60/RSU 60.

There are three schools in Berwick:

 Vivian E. Hussey School (K–3)
 Eric L. Knowlton School (4–5)
 Noble Middle School (6–7)

Students in grades 8–12 from Berwick attend Noble High School in the neighboring town of North Berwick.

Brownfield Grants
The Town of Berwick has been awarded three Brownfield grants: 2015, 2016 and 2017 to help with a downtown revitalization effort.

References

External links
 Town of Berwick official website
 Berwick Public Library
 Berwick Historical Society
 Old Berwick Historical Society
 Berwick at Maine.gov
 Epodunk town profile
 The Falls Chamber of Commerce (historically known as The Greater Somersworth Chamber of Commerce)

 
1631 establishments in the Thirteen Colonies
Populated places established in 1631
Portland metropolitan area, Maine
Towns in York County, Maine
Towns in Maine